Jamie Loeb and Sanaz Marand were the defending champions, but both players chose to compete with different partners. Loeb partnered Catherine Bellis, but lost in the first round. Marand partnered Melanie Oudin, but lost in the quarterfinals.

Kristýna Plíšková and Alison Van Uytvanck won the title, defeating Robin Anderson and Maegan Manasse in the final, 6–2, 6–3.

Seeds

Draw

References 
 Draw

Stockton Challenger - Doubles